Kongquecheng 2016 Jingjinji Champions Cup - Hebei was the first edition of Jingjinji Champions Cup. The tournament was hosted by Hebei China Fortune at Qinhuangdao city. Hebei China Fortune won the title and ¥1 million prize by beating invited team Henan Jianye in the penalty shoot-out.

Participating teams
Beijing Guoan
Hebei China Fortune (Host)
Henan Jianye (Invited team)
Tianjin Teda

Competition format
The competition took the format of a regular knock-out competition. The winners of each of the two matches on the first day competed against each other for the Jingjinji Champions Cup, whilst the two losing sides played in a third-place match.

Matches
All times are local (China Standard Time;  UTC+8).

Semi-finals

Third place play-off

Final

References

Jingjinji Champions Cup
2016 in Chinese football